AMPHORA ("AutoMated Phylogenomic infeRence Application") is an open-source bioinformatics workflow. AMPHORA2 uses 31 bacterial and 104 archaeal phylogenetic marker genes for inferring phylogenetic information from metagenomic datasets. Most of the marker genes are single copy genes, therefore AMPHORA2 is suitable for inferring the accurate taxonomic composition of bacterial and archaeal communities from metagenomic shotgun sequencing data.

First AMPHORA was used for re-analysis of the Sargasso Sea metagenomic data  in 2008, but recently there are more and more metagenomic datasets in the Sequence Read Archive waiting for analysis with AMPHORA2.

AmphoraNet
AmphoraNet
 is the web server implementation of the AMPHORA2 workflow developed by the PIT Bioinformatics Group. AmphoraNet uses the default options of AMPHORA2.

AmphoraVizu

AmphoraVizu
 is a web server developed by the PIT Bioinformatics Group which is capable to visualize outputs generated by the AMPHORA2 or its webserver implementation AmphoraNet.

References 

Metagenomics software
Free bioinformatics software
Phylogenetics software